Big Creek is a stream in Jackson, Cass, Johnson and Henry counties of western Missouri. It is a tributary of the South Grand River.

Big Creek was named for its large size relative to other nearby creeks.

See also
List of rivers of Missouri

References

Rivers of Cass County, Missouri
Rivers of Henry County, Missouri
Rivers of Jackson County, Missouri
Rivers of Johnson County, Missouri
Rivers of Missouri